The Ira F. Powers Warehouse and Factory is a historic industrial building in Portland, Oregon, United States. Built in 1925, it is one of the last remnants of two important phases in Portland's economic history: the city's once-prominent furniture manufacturing and distribution industry, and worker housing for the war industries of the World War II era.

The warehouse was listed on the National Register of Historic Places in 2011.

See also
National Register of Historic Places listings in Northeast Portland, Oregon

References

1925 establishments in Oregon
Commercial Style architecture in the United States
Industrial buildings and structures on the National Register of Historic Places in Portland, Oregon
Industrial buildings completed in 1925
Kerns, Portland, Oregon
Northeast Portland, Oregon
Romanesque Revival architecture in Oregon
World War II on the National Register of Historic Places